Dee Castle was a 15th-century castle, about  east of Ballater, Aberdeenshire, Scotland, and south of the River Dee.

It may be known alternatively as Kinacoul Castle.

History
Dee Castle is thought to be the ancient residence of the Gordons.  In may have been erected as early as the mid-15th century, although another view is that it was built about 1602, burnt in 1641, and allowed to fall into disrepair.

Structure

A small portion of the castle may have been incorporated in a Roman Catholic chapel dated 1797, in its north-west angle. That chapel was out of use by 1898.

See also
Castles in Great Britain and Ireland
List of castles in Aberdeenshire

References

Castles in Aberdeenshire